Allan Charles Gray Mitchell (1902-November 7, 1963) was an American physicist. He was a professor and head of the Indiana University Bloomington department of physics.

Early life and education 
Mitchell was born in 1902, the son of Milly Gray (Dumble) and astronomer Samuel Alfred Mitchell. He earned a master of arts in physics from University of Virginia in 1924. He completed his doctorate in physical chemistry at California Institute of Technology from 1924 to 1927. His advisor was Richard C. Tolman. He completed postdoctorate work in physics with James Franck and Arnold Sommerfeld.

Career 
Mitchell was a professor and head of the Indiana University Bloomington department of physics. From 1943 to 1947, Mitchell served on the Council of the American Physical Society. He served for three terms as the president of the Midwestern Universities Research Association.

Personal life 
He was the father of economist Alice Rivlin.

References

1964 deaths
20th-century American physicists
Indiana University Bloomington faculty
California Institute of Technology alumni
1902 births
University of Virginia alumni
American people of Cornish descent